Vappolotes is a small genus of east Asian funnel weavers. It was first described by B. Li, Z. Zhao and Y. X. Chen in 2019, and it has only been found in China.  it contains only two species: V. ganlongensis and V. jianpingensis.

See also
 List of Agelenidae species

References

Agelenidae genera
Spiders of China